The 2022–23 Ismaily SC season is the club's 102nd season in existence and the 52nd consecutive season in the top flight of Egyptian football. In addition to the domestic league, Ismaily will participate in this season's editions of the Egypt Cup and the EFA Cup.

Overview 
Ismaily announced the appointment of Mido as new manager after only accumulating 6 points from 9 games.

Players

First-team squad

Transfers

In

Out

Pre-season and friendlies

Competitions

Overview

Egyptian Premier League

League table

Results summary

Results by round

Matches 
The league fixtures were announced on 9 October 2022.

Egypt Cup

EFA Cup

References

Ismaily SC seasons
Ismaily
2022 in African football
2023 in African football